Season 2010–11 saw Greenock Morton compete in their fourth consecutive season in the First Division, having defeated Ayr United on the last day of the 2009–10 season.

Story of the season

May

James Grady and his assistant Allan McManus (signed for Dumbarton) were sacked on 9 May, after eight months in charge.

Ryan McGuffie signed a pre-contract agreement with hometown club Queen of the South.

Erik Paartalu returned home to Australia to sign for Brisbane Roar.

Morton release 7 other players, although they may still be re-signed by the new manager when he is appointed. Brian Graham accepted a new deal and Colin Stewart was offered new terms. The released players were Jim McAlister (signed for Hamilton Accies), Steven Masterton (signed for Crawley Town), Alan Reid, Dominic Shimmin (signed for Dundee), Donovan Simmonds (signed for Rushden & Diamonds), Kevin Finlayson (signed for Clyde) and Alex Walker (signed for East Stirlingshire
).

Puma were announced as the new kit manufacturers for the 2010–11 season.

Allan Moore was appointed as manager on 26 May, on a three-year deal.

June

Morton made their first signing of the season on a pre-contract agreement, signing Marc Smyth from Airdrie United; however the move was only fully completed on 29 June.

Colin Stewart also signed a new contract.

Kevin Kelbie signed from Northern Irish side Ballymena United.

David O'Brien joined up with his ex-boss Moore on a free transfer from Stirling Albion.

It was announced on 7 June that Morton would play Blyth Spartans, Gateshead and Bristol Rovers in pre-season friendlies.

Graeme Holmes was signed from Dunfermline Athletic.

Moore appointed Mark McNally as his assistant.

Iain Russell rejected the contract extension in order to sign a two-year contract with Livingston.

Moore signed ex-Queen of the South striker Stewart Kean.

July

With just over a week until the competitive games begin, Morton sign defender Grant Evans on loan from Hamilton Accies.

New contracts were given to youngsters Ryan Kane and Nathan Shepherd.

David MacGregor was given another years contract with the club. This will coincide with his testimonial year at Morton.

French trialists Fouad Bachirou and Tarik Bengelloun were signed on one-year deals. It turned out however that Bengelloun required to serve a lengthy suspension for a bottle throwing incident in France, so the contract offer was rescinded. Bengelloun later returned to France to sign for Racing in Paris.

Stuart McCaffrey was signed on a one-year deal from St Johnstone to take the squad to 22.

Ryan McWilliams was released, and signed for Second Division Ayr United.

August

Morton exited both the Scottish League Cup and Scottish Challenge Cup in the second round, against St Johnstone and Ross County respectively.

In their match against Raith Rovers, Morton gave ex-Dundee fullback Eddie Malone a start as a trialist.

Neil MacFarlane was released to allow room for one more player to come in to the squad. MacFarlane eventually signed for Annan Athletic in the Third Division.

September

Celtic loaned local youngster Sean Fitzharris to Morton on 10 September after he scored a brace against them in a 4–0 Celtic victory at Lennoxtown training centre.

Cameroonian striker Jonathan Toto signed until January, when he is expected to sign for Scottish Premier League side Hearts.

Ex-Falkirk and Hibs midfielder Patrick Cregg was brought in on trial and made his début against Ross County alongside Toto, Cregg was signed by rivals St Mirren.

October

Ryan Kane and Nathan Shepherd joined Ayrshire junior side Glenafton Athletic on loan, and made their debuts in a 6–3 victory over Bellshill Athletic.

Darren Young joined the club as a trialist and made his first appearance from the bench in the draw at Cowdenbeath.

Morton were drawn away to near neighbours Dumbarton, the fifth cup meeting between the pair in two seasons.

November

Darren Young signed on a short-term contract until the end of 2010.

December

Stewart Greacen who had been at the club since 2003 (and had a previous loan spell at Cappielow) was released.

Jonathan Toto also left the club (signing for Etoile FC in March).

After the release of Greacen freed up funds (he signed for Derry City in February 2011), Darren Young was offered a new contract to the end of the season. Young signed the new contract, and the loan of Grant Evans was also extended until the end of the season.

January

Morton were drawn against Airdrie United in the Scottish Cup after their opponents defeated Beith 3–4 in a replay at Bellsdale Park.

Sean Fitzharris was loaned again from Celtic for the remainder of the season.

Derek Lyle was signed on a free transfer from Hamilton, which the manager stated would be the last incoming transfer of the season.

In their re-arranged Scottish Cup fourth round tie at Cappielow, Morton battled back from 0–2 down, with ten men, to salvage a draw and earn a replay at the Excelsior Stadium. The replay in Airdrie finished 5–2 to Morton, allowing them to progress to the fifth round to play Inverness Caledonian Thistle at the Caledonian Stadium.

February

Morton were eliminated from the Scottish Cup, after being annihilated 5–1 by Inverness, with new boy Lyle scoring a late consolation.

March

Morton youngster Declan McDaid (aged 15) became the centre of transfer speculation, and a rejected £35,000 bid from Celtic, with Aston Villa and Sunderland also scouting him.

April

Derek Lyle was arrested by Strathclyde Police, as part of Operation Neptune, on suspicion of possession of controlled substances at his home in Bishopbriggs. This later was confirmed to be "possession with intent to supply", a much more serious charge for which he and partner Nicola Mullen (29) were released on bail pending full committal.

Morton were confirmed as safe from automatic relegation on 10 April, when Stirling Albion failed to beat Dundee; condemning themselves to play in the Second Division next season.

Michael Tidser signed a new three-year contract with the club.

May
Kevin McKinlay, David MacGregor, Kevin Cuthbert, Darren Young, Graeme Holmes and Stewart Kean were all told they would be released in a mass clear-out.

First choice centre-back pairing Stuart McCaffrey and Marc Smyth signed new one-year deals.

Derek Lyle was told he would not receive a new contract in the summer, but a new deal was tabled for Carlo Monti.

Colin Stewart signed a new one-year contract.

Morton finished the season in seventh place after a disappointing defeat to already relegated Stirling Albion at the Doubletree Dunblane Stadium.

First team transfers
From end of 2009–10 season, to last match of season 2010–11

In

Out

Squad (that played for first team)

Fixtures and results

Friendlies

Irn-Bru Scottish Football League First Division

Active Nation Scottish Cup

League Cup

Challenge Cup

League table

Player statistics

All competitions

References

Greenock Morton
Greenock Morton F.C. seasons